This is a list of field hockey stadiums in Pakistan.

References

See also
 List of cricket grounds in Pakistan
 List of sports venues in Karachi
 List of sports venues in Lahore
 List of sports venues in Faisalabad
 List of stadiums by capacity

Hockey
Pakistan
Field hockey venues in Pakistan
Field hockey-related lists